The Solo free routine competition at the 2019 World Aquatics Championships was held on 15 and 17 July 2019.

Results
The preliminary round was started on 15 July at 11:00. The final was held on 17 July at 19:00.

Green denotes finalists

References

Solo free routine